Nepalis in Japan comprise migrants from Nepal to Japan, including temporary expatriates and permanent residents, as well as their locally born descendants. As of June 2022, there are about 125,798 Nepalis living in Japan, which makes them the largest South Asian community in the country.

Employment
Japan was a popular destination for Nepalese immigrants, as they could earn five times more than the average wage in Nepal, even in low-skilled manual jobs in the service sector. Most recently, IT engineers and professionals from Nepal are currently being recruited by Japanese IT companies. There are also some Nepalese joining Japan's garments industry and agriculture sector.

Organizations
The Nepalese Association of Japan (NAJ) was founded in 1988 with the sole intent of protecting the rights and benefits of Nepalese people living in Japan, promoting understanding among them by providing a forum to bring them together and assisting develop friendly relationship between the countries of Japan and Nepal.

Other organizations include NRN-NCC Japan and the Nepalese Student Association in Japan (NESAJ).

See also
 Japan–Nepal relations
 Japanese people in Nepal
 Ethnic groups of Japan

References

Further reading
 

 
Ethnic groups in Japan
Japan
Japan